Hansjörg Reichel (20 July 1922 – 24 December 2013) was an Austrian ice hockey player. He competed in the men's tournament at the 1948 Winter Olympics. He also competed in the water polo tournament at the 1952 Summer Olympics.

References

External links
 

1922 births
2013 deaths
Austrian ice hockey players
Austrian male water polo players
Olympic ice hockey players of Austria
Olympic water polo players of Austria
Ice hockey players at the 1948 Winter Olympics
Water polo players at the 1952 Summer Olympics
Sportspeople from Klagenfurt
20th-century Austrian people